Jolanta (or Jolantha) is a Czech, Lithuanian, Polish and Slovak form of the Greek name Iolanthe. It is derived from Greek words ιολη (iole) "violet" and ανθος (anthos) "flower". Similar names also derived from Iolanthe are Yolande, Jolanda and Yolanda.

Jolanta is a given name. Notable people with the name include:

Jolanta Antas, Polish scientist and professor of linguistics at the Jagiellonian University of Kraków
Jolanta Bartczak (born 1964), Polish long jumper
Jolanta Bebel-Rzymowska (born 1950), Polish fencer
Grażyna Jolanta Ciemniak (born 1948), Polish political figure, member of the Senate of Poland (1993–97)
Jolanta Danielak (born 1955), Polish politician, a member of the Democratic Left Alliance and, previously SdRP
Jolanta Dičkutė (born 1970), Lithuanian politician and Member of the European Parliament for the Labour Party
Jolanta Dukure (born 1979), Latvian race walker
Jolanta Hibner (born 1951), Polish politician
Jolanta Janota (born 1964), Polish track and field sprinter
Jolanta Królikowska (born 1960), Polish fencer
Jolanta Kvašytė (born 1956), Lithuanian painter
Jolanta Kwaśniewska (born 1955), Polish lawyer and charity activist and former First Lady of Poland
Jolanta Łukaszewicz (born 1966), Polish sprint canoeist
Jolanta Polikevičiūtė (born 1970), Lithuanian road cyclist
Jolanta Szczypińska (born 1957), Polish politician
Jolanta Szymanek-Deresz (born 1954), Polish politician
Jolanta Zawadzka (born 1987), Polish chess player

It may also refer to:
Jolenta of Poland (1235–1298), also referred to as Jolanta, Yolande and Yolanda

See also
Jolanda

Feminine given names
Given names derived from plants or flowers
Lithuanian feminine given names
Polish feminine given names

de:Jolanta